Brevin Jordan (born July 16, 2000) is an American football tight end for the Houston Texans of the National Football League (NFL). He played college football at Miami (FL).

Early life
Jordan attended Bishop Gorman High School in Summerlin, Nevada. During his high school career he had over 1,700 yards, 100 receptions and 29 total touchdowns. He committed to the University of Miami to play college football.

College career
As a true freshman in 2018, Jordan played in 12 games with 11 starts and had 32 receptions for 287 yards and four touchdowns. He returned as the starter in 2019 and 2020 and finished his three year stint at Miami with a total of 105 receptions, 1,358 receiving yards, and 13 touchdown receptions in 26 games.

Professional career

Jordan was drafted by the Houston Texans in the fifth round, 147th overall, of the 2021 NFL Draft. On May 12, 2021, Jordan officially signed with the Texans. He scored a nine-yard receiving touchdown in his NFL debut, a 38–22 loss to the Los Angeles Rams in Week 8. He finished his rookie season with nine appearances and two starts. He had 20 receptions for 178 receiving yards and three receiving touchdowns.

In the 2022 season, Jordan appeared in 11 games and started three. He finished with 14 receptions for 128 yards.

NFL career statistics

Personal life
His father, Darrell, played college football for the Northern Arizona Lumberjacks and was drafted in the ninth round of the 1990 NFL Draft by the Atlanta Falcons. However, he would tear his rotator cuff in the preseason and would never make an NFL game appearance.

References

External links
Houston Texans bio
Miami Hurricanes bio

2000 births
Living people
Sportspeople from Las Vegas
Players of American football from Nevada
American football tight ends
Miami Hurricanes football players
Houston Texans players